The 2017 Trofeo Laigueglia was a one-day road cycling race that took place on 12 February 2017 in and around Laigueglia, Italy. It was the 54rd edition of the Trofeo Laigueglia and was rated as a 1.HC event as part of the 2017 UCI Europe Tour.

The race was won by Fabio Felline, riding for an Italian national team select, attacking the peloton with around  remaining, and soloing away to victory by 25 seconds from his closest competitor. Second place went to Romain Hardy for the  team, ahead of 's Mauro Finetto.

Teams
Twenty-three teams were invited to take part in the race. These included four UCI WorldTeams, twelve UCI Professional Continental teams, six UCI Continental teams and an Italian national team.

Result

References

External links

2017 UCI Europe Tour
2017 in Italian sport
2017